Najdi Arabic is the group of Arabic varieties originating from the Najd region of Saudi Arabia. The group includes the majority of bedouin tribes historically residing in deserts surrounding Najd, and as a result several regions surrounding Najd, including the Eastern Province, Al Jawf, Najran, and Northern Borders Regions are now mostly Najdi-speaking. Outside of Saudi Arabia, it is also the main Arabic variety spoken in the Syrian Desert of Iraq, Jordan, and Syria (with the exception of Palmyra oasis and settlements dotting the Euphrates, where Mesopotamian Arabic is spoken) as well as the westernmost part of Kuwait. Najdi dialects are classified as Bedouin dialects.

Najdi Arabic can be divided into four region-based groups:
Northern Najdi, spoken by the tribe of Shammar and surrounding tribes in Ha'il Region in Najd and the Syrian Desert.
Mixed northern-central Najdi of Al-Qassim, Northern Riyadh region of Sudair, and the tribe of Dhafeer around Kuwait.
Central Najdi (Urban Najdi), spoken in the city of Riyadh and surrounding towns and farming communities, and by the tribe of Anazah in the Syrian Desert.
Southern Najdi, spoken by the tribes of Qahtan and Banu Yam, including in the Rub' al-Khali and Najran, as well as the branches of Banu Yam, Ajman and Al Murrah in Eastern Arabia.

Phonology

Consonants
Here is a table of the consonant sounds of Najdi Arabic.

Phonetic notes:
('dog'). Dialect leveling as a result of influence from the Riyadh-based prestige varieties has led to the affricate allophones becoming increasingly less common among younger speakers.
 Historically,  was deleted. It now appears only in borrowings from Classical Arabic; word-medially, this deletion comes along with the lengthening of short vowels.

Vowels

Najdi Arabic exhibits the so-called gahawa syndrome, insertion of epenthetic /a/ after. For example, [gahwah] > [gahawah].

When short  appears in an open syllable that is followed by a nonfinal light syllable, it is deleted. ('got in a hurry') . 

The mid vowels  are typically monophthongs, though they can be pronounced as diphthongs when preceding a plosive, e.g.  ('house') .

Grammar

Morphology
Najdi Arabic sentence structure can have the word order VSO and SVO, however, VSO usually occurs more often. NA morphology is distinguished by three categories which are: nouns ism, verb fial, and particle harf. Ism means name in Arabic and it corresponds to nouns and adjectives in English. Fial means action in Arabic and it corresponds to verbs. Harf means letter and corresponds to pronouns, demonstratives, prepositions, conjunctions and articles. 

Verbs are inflected for number, gender, person, tense, aspect and transitives. Nouns show number (singular and plural) and gender (masculine and feminine).

Complementizers in NA have three different classes which are: relative particle, declarative particle, and interrogative particles. The three different complementizers that are used in Najdi Arabic are: illi, in, itha.

Negation

Two particles are used in negation, which are: ma and la. These particles come before the verb in verbal sentences. ma is used with all verbal sentences but la is used with imperative verb forms indicating present and future tense.

Tense/Aspect System
Najdi Arabic exhibits a number of discourse particles whose main function is to mark different tenses and aspects, including the perfective, imperfective, and progressive aspects. These speech particles "form a link between the time of occurrence of the verb and a point of reference not concurrent with it".  cites six "relative time markers":
 ('already')
 ('still, anymore')
 ('no longer, no more')
 ('still')
 ('not yet')
 ('just')

Most of these discourse particles are preverbal, yet a few of them can show up in non-verbal sentences. These discourse particles have a number of features when they show up in speech:
The particle  occurs with the perfective and active particle and is almost always followed by a personal pronoun suffix.
A few of these particles are not pre-verbal, i.e, they can show up with non-verbal sentences.
 Their function is similar, "setting the time of occurrence of the situation referred to by the sentence in relation to a point of reference".
The particles  and  can sometimes have a suffix in the affirmative.
The particle  occurs with the perfective and imperfective.
The particles  and  occur with the imperfective and the active participle.
The particle  occurs with the perfective.

The following examples illustrate the use of these discourse particles in Najdi Arabic:

 

  

 

 

 

In addition to these,  ('already') may occur before the main verb to convey that something has been done but is no longer the case (equivalent to the experiential perfect in English). There are a number of meanings of  depending on context:
 'had done' when occurring with a past reference point
 'has done' when occurring with a present reference point
 'already' when the action has actually occurred previously to the time of utterance
 'never' with a negative sentence that has a present reference point
 'ever' with an interrogative sentence with a present reference point. 

The following examples illustrate the use of the particle :

In addition, the progressive aspect is marked by the particle  ('to sit'). The particle  surfaces with a verb in the imperfective aspect but cannot surface with a verb in the perfective aspect, as shown in the following two sentences:

The progressive aspect in Najdi Arabic (as well as other dialects is expressed by the imperfective form of the verb, often preceded by the active particle .

See also 
 Varieties of Arabic
 Peninsular Arabic

Footnotes

Bibliography

Further reading
 P.F. Abboud.  1964. "The Syntax of Najdi Arabic", University of Texas PhD dissertation.
 
Al-Sudais, M. S. A critical and comparative study of modern Najdi Arabic Proverbs. PhD diss., University of Leeds, 1976.

Arabic languages
Bedouin Arabic
Mashriqi Arabic
Languages of Saudi Arabia
Languages of Jordan
Languages of Iraq
Languages of Syria
Peninsular Arabic